University Centre of Art, Architecture and Design, abbreviated as CUAAD, is a college located in Guadalajara, Mexico. It is the division of the University of Guadalajara where higher education related to arts, architecture, and design is provided.

The campus is located in several places inside the municipality of Guadalajara:

 The main infrastructure is in Huentitan, at Huentitán el Bajo. The degrees offered at this facility are Architecture, Industrial Design, Fashion Design, Graphic Design, Interior Design, Urbanism, and Audio-Visual Arts. The school was opened  in September 1969. This campus includes the Dr. Horst Hartung Franz Library.
 The School of Plastic Arts (Escuela de Artes Plásticas) is located at Ex Claustro de Santa María de Gracia in downtown Guadalajara. Degrees available at this campus are Contemporary Dance, Folklore Dance, Theater, Painting, Sculpture, Drawing and Stamp, and Photography.
 The School of Music (Escuela de Música) is located at Ex Claustro de San Agustín downtown. This campus offers Concert Soloist, Musical Pedagogy, Musical Composition, Choir Direction and Singing degrees.

External links
(Spanish) Official Website of the CUAAD
(Spanish, English, French and Portuguese) Official Website of the University of Guadalajara

University of Guadalajara